Larne (the name of a Gaelic territory) is a town on the east coast of County Antrim, Northern Ireland, with a population of 18,755 at the 2011 Census. It is a major passenger and freight roll-on roll-off port. Larne is administered by Mid and East Antrim Borough Council. Together with parts of the neighbouring districts of Antrim and Newtownabbey and Causeway Coast and Glens, it forms the East Antrim constituency for elections to the Westminster Parliament and Northern Ireland Assembly. The civil parish is in the historic barony of Glenarm Upper.

History

The coastal area around Larne has been inhabited for millennia, and is thought to have been one of the earliest inhabited areas of Ireland, with these early human populations believed to have arrived from Scotland via the North Channel. Knockdhu, north of Larne, was the site of a Bronze Age promontory fort and settlement. The early coastal dwellers are thought to have had a sophisticated culture which involved trading between the shores of the North Channel and between other settlements on the coasts of Scotland. The coast of Scotland is in fact clearly visible from here. Archaeological digs in the area have found flintwork and other artefacts which have been assigned dates from 6000 BC onwards. The term Larnian has even been coined by archaeologists to describe such flintworks and similar artefacts of the Mesolithic era (and one time to describe Mesolithic culture in Ireland as a whole). Larnian is also currently used to refer to people from Larne.

Larne takes its name from Latharna, a Gaelic territory or túath that was part of the Ulaid minor-kingdom of Dál nAraidi. The name spelt as Latharne was used at one point in reference to the Anglo-Norman cantred of Carrickfergus. Latharna itself means "descendants of Lathar", with Lathar according to legend being a son of the pre-Christian king Úgaine Mór. The town sprang up where the River Inver flows into Larne Lough. This area was known in Irish as Inbhear an Latharna ("rivermouth/estuary of Latharna") and was later anglicised as Inver Larne or simply Inver. Latharna was only applied exclusively to the town in recent centuries. The Roman emperor Severus is known to have described how, in 204 AD, a Roman galley bound for Scotland veered off course to a place called Portus Saxa, which was believed to be Larne Lough. The ancient Greeks also knew of the coast of Antrim and Ptolemy, the 2nd century AD astronomer and geographer, referred to Islandmagee on one of his maps.

There was Viking activity in the area during the 10th and 11th centuries AD. Viking burial sites and artefacts have been found in the area and dated to that time. Ulfreksfjord was an Old Norse name for Larne Lough. According to the Norse historian Snorri Sturluson, Connor, King of Ireland, defeated Orkney Vikings at Ulfreksfjord in 1018. Later anglicised names include Wulfrichford, Wolderfirth, Wolverflete and the surviving name Olderfleet. The ending -fleet comes from the Norse fljot, meaning "inlet". Older- may come from the Norse oldu, meaning "wave".

In the 13th Century the Scots Bissett family built Olderfleet Castle at Curran Point. In 1315, Edward the Bruce of Scotland (brother of Robert the Bruce, King of Scotland) landed at Larne with his 6000 strong army en route to conquer Ireland, where Olderfleet Castle was of strategic importance. Edward saw Ireland as another front in the ongoing war against Norman England.

In 1569, Queen Elizabeth I, Queen of England and Ireland, appointed Sir Moyses Hill as the governor of Olderfleet Castle. It was seen as strategically important for any Tudor conquest of Ulster. Following the 17th century Union of the Crowns of Scotland, England and Ireland under James VI & I many more settlers would have arrived to Ulster via Larne during the Plantation of Ulster. The area around County Antrim itself, however, was not part of the official 17th century Plantation; instead many Scottish settlers arrived in the area through private settlement in the 17th century (as they had also been doing for centuries before).

During the 18th century many Scots-Irish emigrated to America from the port of Larne. A monument in the Curran Park commemorates the Friends Goodwill, the first emigrant ship to sail from Larne in May 1717, heading for Boston, Massachusetts in the New England region of the modern United States of America. Boston's long standing Scots-Irish roots can be traced to Larne. The town is documented as being the first in county Antrim to be taken by United Irishmen during the ill-fated rebellion of 1798.  The Protestant rebels from this area (almost entirely Presbyterian) filled Larne and engaged the government forces around 2am on the morning of 7 June.  This surprise attack drove the garrison to flee the town, at which point the rebel force marched off to join up with McCracken and fight in the Battle of Antrim.

In 1914, Loyalists opposed to the Home Rule Act 1914 prepared for armed resistance. In an episode known as the Larne Gun Running German, Austrian and Italian weapons with ammunition were transported into the ports of Larne and Bangor in the dead of night and distributed throughout Ulster. This event marked a major step in cementing the right to Ulster Unionist self-determination, with the recognition of such a right ultimately leading to the creation of Northern Ireland.

The Troubles 
Larne throughout the course of The Troubles had a significant paramilitary presence in the town, mostly through the presence of the Ulster Volunteer Force (UVF) and Ulster Defence Association (UDA). For further information see UDA South East Antrim Brigade.

The town suffered a number of Provisional Irish Republican Army (IRA) bomb attacks during The Troubles, notably including a large car bomb at the King's Arms hotel in 1980 that caused damage to the main shopping areas, for which the IRA claimed responsibility. This incident was raised in Parliament at the time.

Incidents which involved fatalities
16 September 1972: Sinclair Johnston a UVF member, was shot by the Royal Ulster Constabulary during street disturbances in the town when the Royal Ulster Constabulary were protecting Catholics living in St Johns Place.
20 November 1974: Kevin Regan died from his injuries received in a UVF attack five days before on Maguires bar on Lower Cross Street. The Larne UDA blamed the IRA for the attack.
6 February 1975: Colette Brown, a Catholic, was found by the side of the Killyglen Road after being shot by Loyalists. Two men, one a UVF member the other a Lance Corporal in the UDR (Ulster Defence Regiment) were later convicted of her murder.
8 September 1975: Michael O'Toole a Catholic, died from his injuries sustained in a loyalist booby trap bomb attached to his car two days previously.
24 August 1980: Rodney McCormick a Catholic, was shot dead by the Ulster Defence Association (UDA) in the Antiville area of the town. The Royal Ulster Constabulary convicted the gunmen involved.
11 July 2000: Andrew Cairns a UVF member, was killed by members of the UDA at an eleventh night bonfire celebration in a suspected loyalist feud at Boyne Square. He may also have been murdered due to his alleged involvement in an earlier assault. The Royal Ulster Constabulary detective inspector, George Montgomery, did not find any motive for the murder. David Ervine (PUP) stated that there was no Loyalist feud.

Geography

Larne sits on the western side of a narrow inlet that links Larne Lough to the sea. On the eastern side of the inlet is a peninsula called Islandmagee. To the west of Larne is the ancient volcanic formation of Antrim Plateau, with its glaciated valleys scenically sweeping down to the sea to the north of Larne in what are known as the Glens of Antrim. Larne is 25 miles from the Scottish mainland, with views across the North Channel towards the Mull of Kintyre, Rhins of Galloway, Islay and Paps of Jura often visible from the Larne area – this proximity to Scotland has had a defining influence on Larne's history and culture.

The town is within the small parish of the same name. Like the rest of Ireland, this parish is divided into townlands. The following is a list of townlands within Larne's urban area, along with their likely etymologies:

Antiville (likely from An Tigh Bhile meaning "the house of the old tree")
Ballyboley (from Baile Buaile meaning "townland of the booley/dairy place")
Ballycraigy (from Baile Creige meaning "townland of the rocky outcrop")
Ballyloran (from Baile Loairn meaning "Loarn's townland")
Blackcave North
Blackcave South
Curran and Drumalis (from Córran meaning "crescent" and Druim a' Lios meaning "ridge of the ringfort")
Greenland
Inver (from Inbhear meaning "rivermouth")

Many streetnames in Larne end in brae, such as 'Whitla's Brae'  which comes from the Scots for "hillside".

Civil parish of Larne
The civil parish contains the following townlands:
Antiville, Ballyboley, Ballycraigy, Ballyloran, Blackcave North, Blackcave South, Curran and Drumaliss, Glebe, Greenland and Town Parks.

Gallery

Places of interest

The town has several parks, including Town Park, Chaine Park, Curran Park, and Smiley Park. Other leisure facilities include Larne Leisure Centre and Larne Museum & Arts Centre. Cairndhu Golf Course is situated atop of Ballygally Head and Larne Golf Course on sits atop of the Islandmagee peninsula.

Significant buildings and structures include Olderfleet Castle.

Magheramorne, 5 miles to the south along Larne Lough, has a film studio which was used to film much of HBO TV Series Game of Thrones.

Demography
On Census day (27 March 2011) there were 18,755 people living in Larne, accounting for 1.04% of the NI total. Of these:

 18.59% were aged under 16 years and 18.00% were aged 65 and over;
 51.98% of the usually resident population were female and 48.02% were male;
 67.03% belong to or were brought up Protestant and other non-Catholic Christian (including Christian related) and 25.97% belong to or were brought up Catholic;
 71.62% indicated that they had a British national identity, 30.56% had a Northern Irish national identity and 8.75% had an Irish national identity (respondents could indicate more than one national identity);
 41 years was the average (median) age of the population;
 17.20% had some knowledge of Ulster-Scots and 4.02% had some knowledge of Irish (Gaelic).

Industry and commerce 

Ballylumford power station in Northern Ireland's main power station. Other energy operators in Larne include B9 Energy (a renewable energy development company).

Larne is also home to the headquarters of Caterpillar (NI) Limited (part of the Caterpillar group which manufactures diesel and gas generators), InspecVision (industrial inspection equipment), TerumoBCT (a Japanese manufacturer of intravenous drip solutions and blood products), and the LEDCOM (Larne Enterprise Development Company) business park.

A number of shops can be found along Larne Main Street, Dunluce Street, Laharna Retail Park, and large supermarkets off the Harbour Highway near the harbour. A market is also held every Wednesday at the Larne Market Yard.

Transport

Ferry
Ferries sail from the harbour to Cairnryan in Scotland. Passenger services are operated by P&O Irish Sea which describes the crossings from Larne to Scotland as "the shortest, fastest crossings" due to the close proximity that Larne has to Scotland. An Irish Sea Bridge has been proposed, connecting Larne with Portpatrick in Scotland.

Road

Larne is connected to Belfast by the A8 road. The A2 road or 'Antrim coast road' which runs along the Antrim coast, and passes through the scenic Glens of Antrim, also serves the town. South of the town the A2 passes the side of Larne Lough, via Glynn, Magheramorne, and Ballycarry, to Whitehead and Carrickfergus. The A36 road runs from the town to Ballymena.

Rail
The Belfast–Larne railway line connects to Belfast Great Victoria Street railway station and Belfast Central, via Whitehead, Carrickfergus and Jordanstown, also connects Larne to the Northern Ireland Railways network. Currently there is no freight transport by rail in Northern Ireland. Both Larne Town railway station and Larne Harbour railway station opened on 1 October 1862 and closed for goods traffic on 4 January 1965.

The Ballymena and Larne Railway was a narrow gauge railway. It opened in 1878, was closed to passengers in 1933 and finally completely closed in 1950. Another line ran from Larne to Ballyclare and some parts of it can still be made out where it ran along the Six Mile valley.

Public services

Larne Town Hall, the former headquarters of Larne Borough Council, was completed in 1870. Moyle Hospital offers limited services after the closure of its accident and emergency department.

Education
Secondary schools serving the area include Larne Grammar School and Larne High School. Northern Regional College (formerly Larne Technical College) is a college of further education.

Notable people
Smiley baronets, series of baronets important in History of Larne
Dianne Barr, paralympic swimmer
Billy Brown, musician
James Chaine, Member of Parliament 
Dave Clements, footballer and football manager
Fyfe Ewing, musician, drummer (Therapy?)
Robert Ferguson, disc jockey
Keith Gillespie, Sheffield United and Northern Ireland midfielder.
Robert John Gregg, pioneer of the academic study of Ulster-Scots dialects as well as a linguistic authority on Canadian English
Mark Haggan, activist
Richard Hayward, actor/singer, author
Valerie Hobson, actress
Jeff Hughes, footballer
Michael Hughes, Wimbledon and Coventry City footballer
Whitford Kane, actor
Valerie Lilley, actor (Shameless)
Phillip Magee (The X Factor, series 2 finalist
Sir Ivan Magill, innovating anaesthetist; went to Larne Grammar school
Dave McAuley, former IBF Flyweight world champion boxer
Gareth McAuley, current West Bromwich Albion defender
 Colin McGarry, Professional Darts Corporation player 
 Adam McGurk, footballer
 James McIlroy, Olympic runner
Bobby McKee, Democratic Unionist Party councillor; former Mayor of Larne
Jack McKee, alderman and veteran loyalist politician 
Michael McKeegan, musician (Therapy?)
Amanda McKittrick Ros, author, poet; taught at Millbrook National School during the 1880s
Eddie McMorran, footballer
Eddie Mooney, musician (The Dakotas, The Fortunes)
Hugh Nelson, Lieutenant Governor of British Columbia (1830–1893)
Robert Nelson, electronic music producer (Agnelli & Nelson)
Jonathan Rea, Superbike World Championship rider
Keith Semple, (One True Voice from the ITV series Popstars: The Rivals)
Norman Surplus, first person to complete a circumnavigation of Earth by Autogyro
Harry Towb, actor

Freedom of the borough
In memory of a battle in the town of Musa Qala in Afghanistan in 2006, involving the Royal Irish Regiment, a new regimental march, composed by Chris Attrill and commissioned by Larne Borough Council, was gifted to the regiment on Saturday 1 November 2008 in Larne, during an event in which the regiment was presented with "the Freedom of the Borough".

This gave the regiment the right to march through the towns of the borough with 'flags flying, bands playing and bayonets fixed'. The march was named Musa Qala.

Events
The Friends Goodwill Music Festival occurs in May each year and supports local music.

Sport 
Larne F.C., a professional association football club, plays in the NIFL Premiership. Local amateur football clubs include Larne Technical Old Boys F.C. and Wellington Recreation F.C.

Twin city 
Larne is twinned with Clover, South Carolina, which has named one of its schools, Larne Elementary School, after Larne.

Notable facts
 Larnite – this mineral is named after Larne.

See also
 List of civil parishes of County Antrim
 List of localities in Northern Ireland by population
 List of RNLI stations

References

Further reading

External links

A history of the Port of Larne

 
Ports and harbours of Northern Ireland
Towns in County Antrim
Port cities and towns in Northern Ireland